

Rudolf Sintzenich (13 July 1889 – 24 December 1948) was a general in the Wehrmacht of Nazi Germany during World War II who commanded several divisions. He was a recipient of the Knight's Cross of the Iron Cross.

Awards and decorations
 Knight's Cross of the Iron Cross on 15 August 1940 as generalmajor and commander of 33rd Infantry Division.

References

Citations

Bibliography

 

1889 births
1948 deaths
Lieutenant generals of the German Army (Wehrmacht)
Recipients of the Knight's Cross of the Iron Cross
German prisoners of war in World War II
Military personnel from Munich
German Army generals of World War II